Lanton may refer to:

 Lanton, Gironde, France
 Lanton, Missouri, United States
 Lanton, Northumberland, England
 Lanton, Scottish Borders, Scotland
 a trade name of the drug Lansoprazole